Anne Marie Murphy may refer to:

Anne-Marie Murphy, Irish air passenger and central figure in the Hindawi affair
Anne Marie Murphy (1960 – 2012), American teacher murdered in the Sandy Hook Elementary School shooting
Anne-Marie Murphy, Australian regional police commander, Northern Territory; see Crime in Alice Springs

See also
Anne Murphy (disambiguation)
Murphy (disambiguation)
Anne-Marie (disambiguation)
Anne (disambiguation)